Jerome 'Jerry' G. Plante (born January 8, 1935) is an American politician from Maine. Plante, a Democrat from Old Orchard Beach, served in the Maine House of Representatives from 1957 to 1964.

Plante served as Assistant Minority Leader during his 2nd and 3rd terms in the Maine House (1959-1960; 1961-1962) and as Minority Leader during his 4th and final term (1963-1964). After leaving the legislature, Plante served on the staff of U.S. Congressman Peter Kyros for four terms (1967-75). He later served as town manager of Old Orchard Beach from 1975 to 1990. He also served on the RSU 23 School Committee and on The Ballpark Commission. In 2021, he was inducted into the Maine Franco-American Hall of Fame.

References

1935 births
Living people
People from Old Orchard Beach, Maine
Maine Democrats
Minority leaders of the Maine House of Representatives
Maine city managers
American people of French-Canadian descent
School board members in Maine